Charlie Kemp is a British actor. He played the character of Max King in the ITV soap opera, Emmerdale. He only featured in the series for a few months, with his last appearance on 2 October 2005, in an episode in which his character was killed in a car crash. 

Kemp also appeared in the 2001 British made-for-TV film, Is Harry on the Boat?, and guest starred in the TV series Casualty and in an episode of the TV series Doctors, broadcast 14 November 2008.

On 28 July 2014, he appeared in Coronation Street as the character Oliver Porter, a mediator in a dispute between Nick and Leanne Tilsley.

References

External links

Year of birth missing (living people)
Living people
British male television actors
21st-century British male actors